WKZR (102.3 FM) is a radio station broadcasting a country music format. Licensed to Milledgeville, Georgia, United States, the station is currently owned by Kristopher Kendrick, through licensee Oconee Communications Company, LLC, and features programming from ABC Radio, Jones Radio Network and Motor Racing Network.

History
The station went on the air as WMVG-FM on 1978-10-04.  On 1981-04-06, the station changed its call sign to the current WKZR.

References

External links

KZR
Radio stations established in 1978